Northern Region Academy is a football technical center in Vanuatu. The Academy was founded in December 2015 at Luganville, Santo to serve five provinces in the northern region of Vanuatu.

FIFA's Development Officer Glen Turner and Lambert Maltock, president of the Vanuatu Football Federation, officially opened the center, alongside William Nasak, the Director General of the Youth and Sport, on  December 1, 2015.

In 2017, Vanuatu Football Federation picked several players from the Northern Region Academy to play for the National U17 team in a tournament in Tahiti from 11 to 20 February 2017.

2017 U-17 players

2017 U-20 players

Current U-19 players

References

External links
 
 http://dailypost.vu/vanuatu_sports/navuti-mo-abanga-vilij-oli-kollem-northern-region-academy-home/article_4dea75b0-5244-5858-a5d0-ce48c4a4d2c5.html

Football in Vanuatu